Tanaoctenia is a genus of moths in the family Geometridae.

Species
Tanaoctenia dehaliaria (Wehrli, 1936)
Tanaoctenia haliaria (Walker, 1861)

References
Natural History Museum Lepidoptera genus database

Ennominae